Deep Blood, also known as Sharks and Sangue negli abissi (literally: "Blood in the Abyss"), is a 1989 Italian sharksploitation drama.

The credited director Raffaele Donato (as Raf Donato) only directed the first scene in which the boys gather to seal their blood pact, while the remainder of the film was directed and photographed by Joe D'Amato, who also co-produced the film through his company Filmirage in conjunction with Variety Film.

Synopsis 
On a deserted beach, four boys, Miki, John, Ben and Allan, are told by an Indian the story of the monstrous marine being Wakan and seal a blood pact, a bond of their friendship and mutual assistance in case of danger.

Ten years later, the boys reunite as young men and decide to go on a holiday together. But a killer shark ruins their plans. It attacks the beach community and kills John while he is swimming.

The three remaining friends decide to avenge John's death and hunt the beast. Their task will not be easy, since a legend says that the beast is an incarnation of an ancient hoodoo spirit that has taken the form of a killer shark. The boys set an underwater trap for the shark and lure it into an area in which they have planted powerful explosives, thereby successfully killing the beast.

Production
Joe D'Amato met Raffaele Donato in 1975 on the set of Red Coats and used him repeatedly as an English dialogue coach. He encountered him again years later in the United States and hired him on Deep Blood because he needed someone who was fluent in English.  In an interview D'Amato gave for the 1996 book Spaghetti Nightmares, D'Amato stated that Donato had told him that he wanted to direct a film, but after directing the first scene of the film at the beach, Donato realized that directing films was not what he wanted to do. D'Amato then finished the film on his own.

D'Amato said "(It was shot) in Florida mostly, though we did do a small part along the Mississippi River. (...) The actual underwater scenes though were shot in various places: at Ventotene, in a Roman swimming pool and in a New Orleans aquarium. We built a mechanical shark's head, and for the rest we used stock footage shots." The shark stock footage was bought from the National Geographic Society. In the scene of the explosion killing the shark, footage from Great White is used.

For a time, the film carried the working title Wakan.  It was announced as Sharks (The Challenge) directed by "David Hills" (one of D'Amato's pseudonyms), but D'Amato stated that he finally decided to credit Rafaelle Donato for directing it, since he himself had already shot many films during that year and wanted to avoid that it became apparent that he was doing everything himself.

Cast 
 Frank Baroni as Miki
 Allen Cort as Allan
 Keith Kelsch as Ben
 James Camp as Jason
 Tody Bernard as the sheriff
 John K. Brune as John
 Margareth Hanks as Elisabeth
 Van Jensens
 Don Perrin
 Claude File
 Charles Brill
 Mitzi McCall as Keith Kelsh
 Mike Peavey
 Brian Ricci
 John Mason
 Robert La Brosse (uncredited)

Release 
The tagline on the cover of a VHS release titled Sharks reads, "Where sharks prey, the ocean is a bloodbath."

In Italy, a VHS release was made by Avo Film.

In Germany, the film was released by "VPS" on VHS titled Shakka - Bestie der Tiefe (literally: "Shakka - Beast of the Depths").

In the Czech Republic, the film was released on DVD by "Řitka video" in 2009, under the title Bestie z hlubin. The DVD contains the Czech dub and the English original version with forced Czech subtitles.

In 2021, it was released on DVD and Blu-ray in the US by Severin Films.

Reception
The film was very successful abroad, and even sold well in Japan.

In 1999, Italian film critic Marco Giusti called the film a Z movie version of Jaws. He thought that the dialogue scenes were slightly ridiculous, but that "the small film was likable".

See also
List of killer shark films

References

Bibliography

External links 

 Deep Blood at Variety Distribution

Films directed by Joe D'Amato
Films about sharks
1989 films
1989 horror films
Italian horror films
Natural horror films
1980s Italian-language films
Shark attacks in fiction
Films set in the United States
Films scored by Carlo Maria Cordio
Films about shark attacks
1980s English-language films
1980s Italian films